East Amwell Township is a township in Hunterdon County, in the U.S. state of New Jersey. As of the 2020 United States census, the township's population was 3,917, a decrease of 96 (−2.4%) from the 2010 census count of 4,013, which in turn reflected a decline of 442 (−9.9%) from the 4,455 counted in the 2000 census.

East Amwell Township is located in the southeastern corner of Hunterdon County where it borders both Somerset and Mercer counties, within the heart of the Amwell Valley and Raritan Valley regions. It includes the unincorporated community of Ringoes, the oldest known settlement in Hunterdon County, as well as the communities of Larison's Corner, Weert's Corner and part of Reaville.

History
Amwell Township was established by a royal patent from Queen Anne in 1708. Its territory comprised  and included present day Delaware Township, Raritan Township, Readington Township, East Amwell Township and West Amwell Township and portions of Clinton, Lebanon and Tewksbury Townships. Both East Amwell Township and West Amwell Township were formed on April 6, 1846, when Amwell Township was split in two. Territory was gain in 1854 from Delaware Township, Raritan Township and West Amwell Township, and again from those same three townships in 1897. The township was named for Amwell Township, which in turn was named for Great Amwell/Little Amwell, Hertfordshire in England.

East Amwell was the location of the Lindbergh kidnapping, in which Charles Augustus Lindbergh III, was abducted from the estate owned by Charles Lindbergh and Anne Morrow Lindbergh, and was later found dead nearby.

Geography
According to the United States Census Bureau, the township had a total area of 28.56 square miles (73.96 km2), including 28.46 square miles (73.70 km2) of land and 0.10 square miles (0.27 km2) of water (0.36%).

The northern areas of East Amwell are in the Amwell Valley, while the southern sections are in The Sourlands region. The township borders Delaware Township, Raritan Township and West Amwell Township in Hunterdon County; Hopewell Township in Mercer County; and Hillsborough Township and Montgomery Township in Somerset County.

Unincorporated communities, localities and place names located partially or completely within the township include Amwell, Boss Road, Bowne, Buttonwood Corners, Cloverhill, Furmans Corner, Larisons Corners, Linvale, New Market, Reaville, Rileyville, Ringoes, Rocktown, Snydertown, Union, Unionville, Venliews Corners and Wertsville.

Demographics

2010 census

The Census Bureau's 2006–2010 American Community Survey showed that (in 2010 inflation-adjusted dollars) median household income was $105,846 (with a margin of error of +/− $12,725) and the median family income was $124,659 (+/− $16,916). Males had a median income of $87,727 (+/− $15,438) versus $53,491 (+/− $7,390) for females. The per capita income for the borough was $46,986 (+/− $4,981). About 0.8% of families and 2.1% of the population were below the poverty line, including none of those under age 18 and none of those age 65 or over.

2000 census
As of the 2000 United States census there were 4,455 people, 1,581 households, and 1,305 families residing in the township.  The population density was 155.3 people per square mile (60.0/km2).  There were 1,624 housing units at an average density of 56.6 per square mile (21.9/km2).  The racial makeup of the township was 96.97% White, 0.72% African American, 0.13% Native American, 0.92% Asian, 0.02% Pacific Islander, 0.47% from other races, and 0.76% from two or more races. Hispanic or Latino of any race were 1.53% of the population.

There were 1,581 households, out of which 36.6% had children under the age of 18 living with them, 73.8% were married couples living together, 5.6% had a female householder with no husband present, and 17.4% were non-families. 13.3% of all households were made up of individuals, and 5.6% had someone living alone who was 65 years of age or older.  The average household size was 2.80 and the average family size was 3.07.

In the township the population was spread out, with 25.3% under the age of 18, 5.3% from 18 to 24, 27.6% from 25 to 44, 31.5% from 45 to 64, and 10.2% who were 65 years of age or older.  The median age was 41 years. For every 100 females, there were 103.4 males.  For every 100 females age 18 and over, there were 96.5 males.

The median income for a household in the township was $85,664, and the median income for a family was $90,000. Males had a median income of $60,945 versus $39,306 for females. The per capita income for the township was $37,187.  About 1.8% of families and 1.7% of the population were below the poverty line, including 2.2% of those under age 18 and none of those age 65 or over.

Government

Local government
East Amwell Township is governed under the Township form of New Jersey municipal government, one of 141 municipalities (of the 564) statewide that use this form, the second-most commonly used form of government in the state. The Township Committee is comprised of five members, who are elected directly by the voters at-large in partisan elections to serve three-year terms of office on a staggered basis, with either one or two seats coming up for election each year as part of the November general election in a three-year cycle. At an annual reorganization meeting, the Township Committee selects one of its members to serve as Mayor and another as Deputy Mayor.

, members of the East Amwell Township Committee are Mayor Jenna Casper-Bloom (D, term on committee ends December 31, 2024; term as mayor ends 2023), Deputy Mayor Dante DiPirro (D, term on committee ends 2025; term as deputy mayor ends 2023), Mike Dendis (D, 2025), John Mills (R, 2023) and Tara Ramsey (R, 2023).

Federal, state and county representation 
East Amwell Township is located in the 7th Congressional District and is part of New Jersey's 15th state legislative district. Prior to the 2011 reapportionment following the 2010 Census, East Amwell Township had been in the 23rd state legislative district.

Politics
As of March 2011, there were a total of 3,059 registered voters in East Amwell Township, of which 875 (28.6%) were registered as Democrats, 956 (31.3%) were registered as Republicans and 1,224 (40.0%) were registered as Unaffiliated. There were 4 voters registered as Libertarians or Greens.

In the 2012 presidential election, Republican Mitt Romney received 57.3% of the vote (1,346 cast), ahead of Democrat Barack Obama with 40.9% (961 votes), and other candidates with 1.7% (41 votes), among the 2,364 ballots cast by the township's 3,135 registered voters (16 ballots were spoiled), for a turnout of 75.4%. In the 2008 presidential election, Republican John McCain received 54.8% of the vote (1,405 cast), ahead of Democrat Barack Obama with 42.4% (1,088 votes) and other candidates with 1.7% (44 votes), among the 2,564 ballots cast by the township's 3,180 registered voters, for a turnout of 80.6%. In the 2004 presidential election, Republican George W. Bush received 57.3% of the vote (1,452 ballots cast), outpolling Democrat John Kerry with 41.8% (1,059 votes) and other candidates with 1.0% (30 votes), among the 2,534 ballots cast by the township's 3,043 registered voters, for a turnout percentage of 83.3.

In the 2013 gubernatorial election, Republican Chris Christie received 71.6% of the vote (1,223 cast), ahead of Democrat Barbara Buono with 26.2% (448 votes), and other candidates with 2.2% (37 votes), among the 1,770 ballots cast by the township's 3,088 registered voters (62 ballots were spoiled), for a turnout of 57.3%. In the 2009 gubernatorial election, Republican Chris Christie received 61.2% of the vote (1,196 ballots cast), ahead of  Democrat Jon Corzine with 29.2% (571 votes), Independent Chris Daggett with 7.4% (145 votes) and other candidates with 1.0% (20 votes), among the 1,953 ballots cast by the township's 3,094 registered voters, yielding a 63.1% turnout.

Education 
The East Amwell Township School District serves public school students in pre-kindergarten through eighth grade at East Amwell Township School. As of the 2018–19 school year, the district, comprised of one school, had an enrollment of 355 students and 37.8 classroom teachers (on an FTE basis), for a student–teacher ratio of 9.4:1.

Public school students in ninth through twelfth grades attend Hunterdon Central High School, part of the Hunterdon Central Regional High School District in central Hunterdon County, which serves students from Delaware Township, East Amwell Township, Flemington Borough, Raritan Township and Readington Township. As of the 2018–19 school year, the high school had an enrollment of 2,844 students and 238.8 classroom teachers (on an FTE basis), for a student–teacher ratio of 11.9:1. Seats on the high school district's nine-member board of education are allocated based in the population of the five constituent municipalities who participate in the school district, with one seat allocated to East Amwell Township.

Eighth grade students from all of Hunterdon County are eligible to apply to attend the high school programs offered by the Hunterdon County Vocational School District, a county-wide vocational school district that offers career and technical education at its campuses in Raritan Township and at programs sited at local high schools, with no tuition charged to students for attendance.

Transportation

Route 31 passes through mostly along the western border with West Amwell Township. Route 179 and U.S. Route 202 pass through near Ringoes, with Route 31 becoming concurrent with U.S. 202 where they intersect.

Major county roads that go through the township are County Route 514 (along the border with Raritan) and County Route 579. The closest limited access road is Interstate 295 in neighboring Hopewell Township.

The Hopewell Project
East Amwell is home to an experimental renewable energy project called The Hopewell Project, which uses solar power to generate hydrogen that is used to provide 100% of a home's heating, cooling and electrical needs. The Hopewell Solar-Hydrogen Residence was dedicated on October 20, 2006.

Wineries
 Old York Cellars
 Unionville Vineyards

Notable people

People who were born in, residents of, or otherwise closely associated with East Amwell Township include:

 James Buchanan (1839–1900), represented New Jersey's 2nd congressional district from 1885 to 1893
 Matt Ioannidis (born 1994), defensive end for the Washington Football Team of the National Football League
 Charles Lindbergh (1902–1974) and Anne Morrow Lindbergh (1906–2001), aviators. The Lindbergh kidnapping occurred at the family home in East Amwell, though press reports were filed from the nearby town of Hopewell
 Andrew Maguire (born 1939), represented New Jersey's 7th congressional district from 1975 to 1981
 David Stout Manners (1808–1884), Mayor of Jersey City, New Jersey from 1852 to 1857
 Horace Griggs Prall (1881–1951), acting Governor of New Jersey in 1935
 Jason Read (born 1977), rower who rowed in the bow seat in the 2004 Summer Olympics gold medal-winning U.S. Men's Rowing Team Eight

References

External links

East Amwell Township website
Hunterdon County web page for East Amwell Township
East Amwell Township School

School Data for the East Amwell Township School, National Center for Education Statistics
Hunterdon Central Regional High School District
Hunterdon Land Trust Alliance

 
1846 establishments in New Jersey
Populated places established in 1846
Township form of New Jersey government
Townships in Hunterdon County, New Jersey